Ürkmez is a small coastal town with own municipality and administratively depending the district center of Seferihisar in İzmir Province, Turkey.

It is also a holiday resort, situated at a distance of approximately 50 km from the province center of Izmir. Ürkmez has a permanent population of about 5,000 during winter and the number of inhabitants rises to about 25,000 during the summer.

Ürkmez is where the ancient city of Lebedos was located and there are still some traces of the historic settlement. There are also thermal springs in Ürkmez.

See also
 Lebedos

Towns in Turkey
Populated places in İzmir Province